Dragan Marjanović (born 3 April 1954) is a former Bosnian football forward who played in the former Yugoslavia and Austria.

Career
Born in Jajce, Marjanović started playing football for the youth side of Elektrobosna Jajce. In 1972, he joined the senior team was leading goal-scorer in the club's regional league. He was recruited by FK Borac Banja Luka and signed a four-year contract with the club in 1974.

Marjanović helped the club achieve an immediate return to the Yugoslav First League for the 1975–76 season. He played six seasons for the club in the top flight, followed by another three in the second division.

Marjanović would spend the 1984–85 season back with his hometown club Elektrobosna Jajce. He signed with Austrian club Kapfenberger SV the following season, scoring 21 goals in the regional league. He then returned to play for Borac Banja Luka until he retired in 1991.

After retiring from playing football, Marjanović coached Borac Banja Luka's youth club.

References

External links
BiH Timovi u Yu ligi
EX YU Fudbalska Statistika po godinama

1954 births
Living people
Yugoslav footballers
FK Borac Banja Luka players
Kapfenberger SV players
Expatriate footballers in Austria
Association football forwards